R. J. Barrow may refer to:

 Robert Irving Barrow (1805-circa 1890), artist and architectural illustrator
 Rosemary Barrow (1968–2016), art historian